McVicar's Bus Services was an Australian bus operator that operated services in the south-west suburbs of Sydney from 1919 until 1978.

Company history
McVicar's Bus Service grew to be one of the largest in New South Wales. It spanned three generations of the McVicar family, operating from 1919 to 1978. The company began when Archibald Robert Brownlow McVicar began a bus service from Lidcombe railway station to Berala. McVicar extended the service to Regents Park and gained permission to run from Lidcombe to the Lidcombe State Hospital on Sunday afternoons: there was considerable business for bus operators running to hospitals and cemeteries on Sundays. In 1923 McVicar's weekly service to the hospital was increased to a daily frequency. In 1925, McVicar was given permission to operate a bus service between Cabramatta and Bankstown. In 1926, McVicar was granted approval to continue using solid tyres instead of pneumatic tyres.

By 1927 McVicar was operating from Bankstown to the Milperra Soldiers' Settlement as well as Picnic Point, East Hills and Panania. In 1930 McVicar's began running between Bankstown and Burwood. The McVicar depot was developed on the corner of James and Joseph Streets, Lidcombe, and in 1935 Arch was joined by his son, Arch McVicar Junior, as an apprentice mechanic and in that year the first diesel engine bus was acquired for the firm.

World War II saw the firm restricting the number of vehicles to 12 despite the heavy passenger demands operating to and from essential industries, working a daily three-shift operation. By 1950 McVicars had 31 vehicles in daily service and several others in the workshop. The peak period for the private bus industry was said to have been up to the mid-1950s. There were relatively few cars on the roads and bus patronage was high, with timetables drawn up in a way to attract customers rather than economic necessity. However, with rising costs from big wage claims and declining patronage to greatly increased car usage, the company this time suffered difficulties though this was partly offset by revenue generated from the school bus services.

In 1951 a bus was stolen from McVicar's and abandoned at Clyde.

In February 1962 Archibald McVicar Snr died at the age of 72. At that time the company's fleet was credited with being one of the largest in the Sydney suburban area. Arch McVicar Jnr and his sister Mavis took over the running of McVicar's Bus Service as joint directors. Mavis had joined the office side of the operation in 1931 after leaving school taking over from Mrs McVicar Snr. She was the mainstay of the company's administration for nearly 40 years.

The family decided to sell the business in 1978. 
The company was split three ways on 25 March 1978:
Routes 12, 22, 23 (including Roselands), 24, 38, 125 & 137 transferred to Bankstown Bus Lines, later renamed South Western Coach Lines (Max Holman)
Route 27 transferred to Fairtown Pty Ltd, trading as Bankstown-Strathfield Bus Service (Ron Treuer)
Route 123 transferred to Drummond Transit, (Ron Drummond) no buses included to this operator
Through a series of acquisitions these routes are now all operated by Transdev NSW in a modified form.

McVicar's Bus Services was wound up in 1978. , the depot office remains and is occupied by Guardian Funerals.

Routes

Fleet

When the business was sold in 1978 the fleet consisted of 55 buses, mainly AECs and Leylands operating on nine routes. McVicar's livery was a red body with cream window pillars and a brown roof with a McVicar Omnibus Service monogram on the sides. A variation of this livery was adopted by Bankstown-Strathfield Bus Service and remained in use until the operation was sold to Transit First in May 2003. Some of the number plates carried by McVicar's buses continue to be used by Transdev NSW. See McVicar's Bus Services at Australian Bus Fleet Lists.

Photographs of McVicar's buses
Ken Magor collection 
Page 1 
Page 2 
Page 3 
Page 4
Bus Australia Photo Gallery including Leon Batman photos as well as others

See also
Buses in Sydney

References

Other links
Technical drawing of McVicar's bus held by Powerhouse Museum

Bus companies of New South Wales
Bus transport in Sydney
Transport companies established in 1919
Transport companies disestablished in 1978
Australian companies established in 1919
Defunct bus companies of Australia
Australian companies disestablished in 1978